Te Puku O Te Whenua or "the belly of the land" was one of the five new New Zealand parliamentary Māori electorates created in 1996 for MMP. It was replaced in the 1999 election.

Population centres
The electorate included the following population centres:

 Dannevirke
 Feilding
 Hastings
 Hāwera
 Masterton
 Napier
 New Plymouth
 Palmerston North
 Taumarunui
 Taupō
 Wanganui

Rohe
The electorate included the following rohe:

 Ngati Apa, Ngāti Rangitāne, Ngāti Raukawa - Feilding, Palmerston North & Wanganui
 Ngati Kahungunu - Hawke's Bay, Hastings, Napier and Wairarapa
 Ngati Maru, Ngati Mutanga, Ngati Tama - Taranaki
 Te Atiawa - Taranaki

History
Te Puku O Te Whenua, or the belly of the land, was one of the five new Māori electorates created for the 1996 election with the introduction of mixed-member proportional (MMP) representation, and which were all won by the Tight Five of the New Zealand First from  Labour. The 1996 election was won by Rana Waitai.

In the 1999 election it was substantially replaced by Ikaroa-Rāwhiti.

Members of Parliament
Key

List MPs

References

Historical Māori electorates
1996 establishments in New Zealand
1999 disestablishments in New Zealand